The 1980–81 Tennessee Volunteers basketball team represented the University of Tennessee as a member of the Southeastern Conference during the 1980–81 college basketball season. Led by third-year head coach Don DeVoe, the team played their home games at the Stokely Athletic Center in Knoxville, Tennessee. The Volunteers finished with a record of 21–8 (12–6 SEC, 2nd) and received an at-large bid to the 1981 NCAA tournament as the 4 seed in the East region. After an opening round win over VCU, Tennessee was defeated by No. 1 seed and eventual Final Four participant Virginia, 62–48.

This was the third of five straight seasons of NCAA Tournament basketball for the Tennessee men's program. The Volunteers would not reach the Sweet Sixteen again until the 2000 NCAA tournament.

Roster

Schedule and results

|-
!colspan=9 style=| Regular season

|-
!colspan=9 style=| SEC tournament

|-
!colspan=9 style=| NCAA tournament

Rankings

NBA Draft

References

Tennessee Volunteers basketball seasons
Tennessee
Tennessee
Volunteers
Volunteers